South Terrace, Fremantle is a road in Fremantle, Western Australia that is renowned as the "Cappucino Strip" of Fremantle, due to the high number of coffee shops and restaurants.

It is also the location of the Fremantle Technical College, Fremantle Markets, and Fremantle Hospital, along with a significant number of heritage buildings.

A number of historic hotels are on South Terrace, including the Sail and Anchor (formerly the Freemasons Hotel), the Newport, Norfolk, Davilak and South Beach hotels.

See also

Notes

External links
 

 
Streets in Fremantle
Restaurant districts and streets in Australia
Articles containing video clips